Vivienne Frances Faull (born 20 May 1955) is a British Anglican bishop and Lord Spiritual. Since 2018, she has served as the Bishop of Bristol. In 1985, she was the first woman to be appointed chaplain to an Oxbridge college. She was later a cathedral dean, and the only female cathedral provost in Church of England history, having served as Provost of Leicester from 2000 to 2002.

Early life
Faull was born on 20 May 1955. She was educated at The Queen's School, Chester, an all-girls private school. She studied at St Hilda's College, Oxford, and graduated in 1977 with a Bachelor of Arts (BA) degree; it was promoted to a Master of Arts (MA Oxon) in 1982. When she began studying theology at St John's College, Nottingham, she became the first woman to be paid by the Church of England to do so.

Ordained ministry
Faull was licensed as a deaconess in the Church of England in 1982, and ordained as a deacon in 1987 and as a priest in 1994. She served first at  the Church of St Matthew and St James, Mossley Hill, Liverpool, and then as Chaplain at Clare College, Cambridge. From 1990 to 1994, she was on the staff at Gloucester Cathedral. In 1994 she became Canon Pastor at Coventry Cathedral, later becoming Vice Provost, before moving to Leicester in 2000.

On 13 May 2000, she was installed as Provost of Leicester Cathedral – the first (and, due to the Cathedrals Measure 1999 redesignating all cathedral provosts as deans, only) female cathedral provost in Church of England history. In 2002, when her job title (but not the essential nature of the role) changed, she became the Dean of Leicester – and thus, with that change of title, the first female dean in the Church of England.

It was announced on 5 July 2012 that Faull was to become Dean of York in late 2012. She was duly installed at York Minster on 1 December.

Episcopal ministry
Faull was thought by many to be a leading candidate for the first woman appointed a bishop in the Church of England when canon law was altered in 2014 to allow female bishops, but the first woman to be made a bishop was Libby Lane. Faull eventually became the 18th female bishop in 2018.

On 15 May 2018, it was announced that Faull would be the next Bishop of Bristol, the diocesan bishop of the Diocese of Bristol, in succession to Mike Hill. She officially took up the appointment when she was elected and confirmed on 25 June 2018. On 3 July 2018, she was consecrated a bishop by Justin Welby, the Archbishop of Canterbury, during a service at St Paul's Cathedral, London. She was installed as the 56th Bishop of Bristol at Bristol Cathedral on 20 October 2018 and introduced as a Lord Spiritual at the House of Lords on 23 October.

Views
Faull's views have been described as "centrist to liberal" and as "open evangelical".

In 2014, she said that she supported the blessing of same-sex partnerships. In 2023, in reaction to the announcement that the Church of England was planing on introducing bleassing for same-sex couples, she stated "I further support a change to the law that would allow for the marriage of same-sex couples in church, and regret that this proposal does not extend that legal change".

Controversies

In 2013 Faull was the target of hate mail during an unsuccessful campaign to have the remains of Richard III interred in York Minster. Protests against Faull's involvement in the decision to inter the remains in Leicester Cathedral continued, ultimately resulting in the prosecution of one protester, and an online petition calling for the removal of the dean.

In October 2016 Faull was instrumental in the sacking of all the York Minster bellringers with no notice on grounds of safeguarding, and the subsequent suspension of a carillonneur. The locks were changed at the Minster and the ringers unable to lower the bells for safety. This was called 'uncharitable' and 'unChristian' in the press. The Archbishop, John Sentamu, decried the way that Faull had been "hounded" and said that she was one of the best deans he had ever worked with. The bell ringers had been dismissed following a claim of sexual assault against one of its members; although no conviction followed the cathedral chapter felt there was an ongoing risk. Several of the original bell ringers were recruited to the new team.

Personal life
In 1993, Faull married Michael Duddridge, a hospital doctor.

Styles
 Miss Vivienne Faull (1955–1987)
 The Revd Vivienne Faull (1987–1994)
 The Revd Canon Vivienne Faull (1994–2000)
 The Very Revd Vivienne Faull (2000–2018)
 The Rt Revd Vivienne Faull (2018–present)

Honours
In 2014, Faull was awarded an honorary Doctor of Philosophy (DPhil) degree by the University of Gloucestershire "for her outstanding contribution to the church and her work for the equality of women". On 20 March 2015, she was awarded an honorary Doctor of Letters (DLitt) degree by the University of Chester "in recognition of her outstanding contribution to Ministry in this country, in particular in recognition of her roles as Dean of Leicester and Dean of York". On 17 July 2015, she was awarded an honorary degree by the University of York.

References

1955 births
Living people
People educated at The Queen's School, Chester
Alumni of St Hilda's College, Oxford
Alumni of St John's College, Nottingham
Provosts and Deans of Leicester
Deans of York
Bishops of Bristol
Women Anglican bishops
21st-century Church of England bishops
Lords Spiritual